Aurora Gima (November 7, 1974 – October 7, 2000) was a Romanian-born American professional tennis player.

Gima, originally from the Black Sea city of Constanța in Romania, was raised in New York from the mid 1980s. She competed on the professional tour in the 1990s and reached a career high singles ranking of 164, winning a $25,000 ITF title in Nigeria in 1991. At the 1992 US Open she won through to the final qualifying round, defeating Miriam Oremans en route. She also won two qualifying matches at the 1993 Australian Open, over Kristine Radford and Katarína Studeníková. Her only WTA Tour main draw appearance came as a doubles player, at Québec in 1993.

ITF finals

Singles: 4 (1–3)

Doubles: 2 (0–2)

References

External links
 
 

1974 births
2000 deaths
American female tennis players
Romanian female tennis players
Romanian emigrants to the United States
Sportspeople from Constanța
20th-century American women
20th-century American people